The 2011/12 FIS Freestyle Skiing World Cup was the thirty third World Cup season in freestyle skiing organised by International Ski Federation. The season started on 9 December 2011 and ended on 18 March 2012. This season included five disciplines: moguls, aerials, ski cross, halfpipe and slopestyle.

Men

Moguls

Ski Cross

Aerials

Halfpipe

Slopestyle

Ladies

Moguls

Ski Cross

Aerials

Halfpipe

Slopestyle

Men's standings

Overall 

Standings after 37 races.

Moguls 

Standings after 13 races.

Aerials 

Standings after 10 races.

Ski Cross 

Standings after 10 races.

Halfpipe 

Standings after 2 races.

Slopestyle 

Standings after 2 races.

Ladies' standings

Overall 

Standings after 37 races.

Moguls 

Standings after 13 races.

Aerials 

Standings after 10 races.

Ski Cross 

Standings after 10 races.

Halfpipe 

Standings after 2 races.

Slopestyle 

Standings after 2 races.

Nations Cup

Overall 

Standings after 64 races.

Men 

Standings after 32 races.

Ladies 

Standings after 32 races.

References

FIS Freestyle Skiing World Cup
World Cup
World Cup